is a passenger railway station located in the city of Uwajima, Ehime Prefecture, Japan. It is operated by JR Shikoku.

Lines

Layout
The station, which is unstaffed, consists of a ground-level island platform serving two tracks. It is connected to the station building by a level crossing. A bike shed is provided across the road from the station.

History
With the privatization of JNR on 1 April 1987, control passed to JR Shikoku.

Surrounding area
Matsuyama Expressway (Uwajima Road) Uwajima North IC

See also
 List of railway stations in Japan

References

External links
Station timetable

Railway stations in Ehime Prefecture
Yodo Line
Yosan Line
Railway stations in Japan opened in 1941
Uwajima, Ehime